"Brief for Murder" is the first episode of the third series of the 1960s cult British spy-fi television series The Avengers, starring Patrick Macnee and Honor Blackman. It was first broadcast by ABC on 28 September 1963. The episode was directed by Peter Hammond and written by Brian Clemens.

Plot
Steed and Cathy set a trap to catch two corrupt lawyers.

Cast
 Patrick Macnee as John Steed
 Honor Blackman as Cathy Gale 
 John Laurie as Jasper Lakin 
 Harold Scott as Miles Lakin 
 Helen Lindsay as Barbara Kingston 
 Alec Ross as Ronald Henry Wescott 
 June Thody as Dicey Hunt 
 Anthony Baird as Wilson 
 Alice Fraser as Miss Elizabeth Prinn 
 Fred Ferris as Inspector Marsh 
 Michael Goldie as Bart

References

External links

Episode overview on The Avengers Forever! website

The Avengers (season 3) episodes
1963 British television episodes